Majcichov is a village and municipality of Trnava District in the Trnava region of Slovakia.

References

External links
Statistics.sk
En.e-obce.sk

Villages and municipalities in Trnava District